Les Jeux de société is a 1989 film by Éric Rohmer, starring Alexandra Stewart. The length is 57 min.

External links
 

French comedy-drama films
1989 films
Films directed by Éric Rohmer
1980s French films
French television films